Members Only was an American hip hop collective from Broward County, Florida, formed in 2014. It was originally only a duo consisting of Jahseh Onfroy (XXXTentacion) and Stokeley Goulbourne (Ski Mask the Slump God) after the two met in a juvenile detention center. It closely associated with another collective named Very Rare, and members of both collectives also refer to themselves as VR All-Stars. Following the release of their fourth project, Members Only, Vol. 4, the collective has gone on an indefinite hiatus, with some of its most prominent members such as Craig Xen and Wifisfuneral exiting the group.

Three former members are now deceased; co-founder XXXTentacion died in 2018, Khaed in 2019, and Tablez in 2022.

Members

Current members 
 Ski Mask the Slump God (2014–present)
 absentwill (2015–present)
 Bass Santana (2015–present)
 Flyboy Tarantino (2015–present)
 Kid Trunks (2015–present)
 Kin$oul (2015–present)
 Danny Towers (2015–present)
 SB (2015–present)
 Bhris (2015–present)
 PRXZ (2015–present)
 Robb Banks (2016–present)
 Tankhead666 (2016–present)
 Icecat Laflare (2016–present)
 LuxurySleepy (2015–present)
 Kidway (2017–present)
 Ikabod Veins (2017–present)
 Rawhool Mane (2017-present)
 Ratchet Roach (2017–present)
Kilo Jr (2015-present)
 Reddz (2018–present)

Former members 
 XXXTentacion (2014–2018; his death)
 Tablez (2015–2016; died 2022)
 Wifisfuneral (2015–2017)
 Fukkit (2015–2017)
ElGato (2015-2018)
 Khaed (2015–2019; his death)
 Killstation (2015-2019) 
 Craig Xen (2015–2019)
 Cooliecut (2017–2019)

Discography

Studio albums

Mixtapes

Extended plays

Singles

Tours
 The Revenge Tour (2017)
 Members Only vs. the World (2019)

See also
East Coast hip hop
XXXTentacion discography
 Ski Mask the Slump God discography
 List of East Coast hip hop artists

References

Hip hop collectives
Trap musicians
Emo rap musicians